Taibaiella coffeisoli is a Gram-negative, rod-shaped, obligately aerobic, non-spore-forming and non-motile  bacterium from the genus of Taibaiella which has been isolated from soil from a coffee plantation from Arusha in East Africa.

References

External links
Type strain of Taibaiella coffeisoli at BacDive -  the Bacterial Diversity Metadatabase

Chitinophagia
Bacteria described in 2016